Kočno pri Polskavi is a settlement in the foothills of the Pohorje range in the Municipality of Slovenska Bistrica in northeastern Slovenia. The area is part of the traditional region of Styria. It is now included with the rest of the municipality in the Drava Statistical Region.

Name
The name of the settlement was changed from Kočno to Kočno pri Polskavi in 1953.

Gromberk Castle
The ruins of Gromberk Castle lie to the northwest of the settlement. It originated in the 10th century and was part of the estate of the Counts of Celje. It fell into disrepair after a peasant revolt in the late 17th century and relatively few remains are still visible today.

References

External links
Kočno pri Polskavi at Geopedia

Populated places in the Municipality of Slovenska Bistrica